Vlad Ioviţă (December 25, 1935, Cocieri, USSR - June 23, 1983, Chişinău, Moldavian SSR) was a film director from Moldova also known as a writer and publicist.

Biography 
Vlad Ioviţă was born on December 25, 1935, in Cocieri. He received his training at the Vaganova Academy of Russian Ballet (1954), and then followed the High Courses for Scriptwriters and Film Directors (1962-1964), then worked for Moldova-Film.

Also, Vlad Ioviţă fulfilled the function of secretary of the Union of Filmmakers of Moldova (1981-1983). He was awarded the State Prize and the honorary title of Merited Artist (1982). He died on June 23, 1983, in Chisinau municipality, being buried in his native village.

Film Director

Action movies

 Nuntă la palat (1969)
 Dimitrie Cantemir (în colaborare cu Vitalie Calaşnicov, 1973)
 Calul, puşca şi nevasta (1975)
 La porţile satanei (1980)

Documentary movies
 Fântâna (1966)
 Unde joacă moldovenii (1967)
 Malanca, carnavalul de iarnă (1968) 
 Trăiască Victoria! (1971) 
 Dansul toamnelor noastre (1983)

Screenplay
 Se caută un paznic (1967)
 Vica, eu şi foiletonul (s/m, 1972)
 Dimitrie Cantemir (1973) 
 Durata zilei (în colaborare cu Valeriu Gagiu, 1974)
 Calul, puşca şi nevasta (în colaborare cu Nicolae Esinencu, 1975)
 Povestea lui Făt-Frumos (în colaborare cu Nicolae Esinencu, 1977) 
 La porţile satanei (în colaborare cu Nicolae Esinencu, 1980)

Works
 Dincolo de ploaie (1970; 1979)
 Trei proze (1971)
 Dimitrie-Vodă Cantemir (1973)
 Făt-Frumos. Nuvelă cinematografică (Ed. Literatura artistică, Chişinău, 1981)
 Un hectar de umbră pentru Sahara (1984)
 Friguri (1988) 
 Un hectar de umbră pentru Sahara. Antologie, tabel cronologic şi referinţe istorico-literare de Viorica Zaharia-Stamati (Ed. Litera internaţional, Chişinău, 2004)

Gallery

References

Bibliography 
 Lirism şi obiectivare în proza de început a lui Vlad Ioviţă. În "Metaliteratură. Analele Facultăţii de Filologie", vol. VI (Chişinău, 2002) 
 Valenţele lirismului baladesc în proza lui Vlad Ioviţă. În "Revista de lingvistică şi ştiinţă literară" din Chişinău, nr. 5-6/2003
 Un hectar de umbră pentru Sahara: tentaţia formulei epice obiective. În "Metaliteratură. Analele Facultăţii de Filologie, vol. VII (Chişinău, 2003)
 Dimitrie Cantemir văzut de Vlad Ioviţă. În "Metaliteratură. Analele Facultăţii de Filologie", vol.VIII (Chişinău, 2003)
 Fantasticul în cotidian. În "Metaliteratură. Analele Facultăţii de Filologie", vol. VIII (Chişinău, 2003) 
 “Ciudaţii” şi “suciţi” în proza lui V. Ioviţă. În "Conferinţa profesorilor Universităţii Pedagogice de Stat "Ion Creangă". Tezele conferinţei (Chişinău, 2004) 
 Lirismul baladesc la Vlad Ioviţă. În "Analele ştiinţifice ale doctoranzilor şi competitorilor. Universitatea Pedagogică de Stat "Ion Creangă", vol. V (Chişinău, 2004)
 Despre tipologia personajelor în proza lui Vlad Ioviţă. În "Metaliteratură. Analele Facultăţii de Filologie", vol. IX (Chişinău, 2004)
 Vaniuţa Milionaru – un “ciudat” dar nu un învins. În "Metaliteratură. Analele Facultăţii de Filologie", vol. X (Chişinău, 2004)
 Dialogul intertextual în nuvela "Se caută un paznic". În "Metaliteratură. Analele Facultăţii de Filologie", vol. XI (Chişinău, 2005)
 Modalităţi de psihologizare în proza lui Vlad Ioviţă. În "Limba română" din Chişinău, nr. 5/2005.
 Mihai Cimpoi, Alexandru Burlacu, Dumitru Olărescu, Ana-Maria Plămădeală - Vlad Ioviţă. Dincolo de timp (Ed. Cartea Moldovei, Chişinău, 2005)

External links 
 Web-enciclopedia filmului moldovenesc - Vlad Ioviţă
 Webpagina lui Vlad Ioviţă
 
 Atelierul de scriere creativă Vlad Ioviţă

1935 births
1983 deaths
People from Dubăsari District
Moldovan documentary filmmakers
Moldovan film directors
Moldovan screenwriters
Eastern Orthodox Christians from Moldova
Moldovan writers
Moldovan male writers
20th-century screenwriters